Ballspielverein Borussia 09 e. V. Dortmund, commonly known as Borussia Dortmund, BVB, or simply Dortmund, is a German professional sports club based in Dortmund, North Rhine-Westphalia. It is best known for its men's professional football team, which plays in the Bundesliga, the top tier of the German football league system. The club have won eight league championships, five DFB-Pokals, one UEFA Champions League, one Intercontinental Cup, and one UEFA Cup Winners' Cup.

Founded in 1909 by eighteen football players from Dortmund, the football team is part of a large membership-based sports club with more than 145,000 members, making Borussia Dortmund the second largest sports club by membership in Germany. The club has active departments in other sports, namely in women's handball. Since 1974, Dortmund have played their home games at Westfalenstadion; the stadium is the largest in Germany, and Dortmund has the highest average attendance of any association football club in the world.

Borussia Dortmund's colours are black and yellow, giving the club its nickname die Schwarzgelben. They hold a long-standing rivalry with Ruhr neighbours Schalke 04, with whom they contest the Revierderby. They also contest Der Klassiker with Bayern Munich.

In terms of Deloitte's annual Football Money League, Dortmund was in 2021 ranked as the second richest sports club in Germany, and the 12th richest football team in the world. Moreover, under the directorship of Michael Zorc in the 2010s, Dortmund have cultivated a reputation for spotting and developing young talent, and have remained focused on developing a youth system. They have also received plaudits for generally adhering to an attacking footballing philosophy.

History

Foundation and early years

The club was founded on 19 December 1909 by a group of young men unhappy with the Catholic church-sponsored Trinity Youth, where they played football under the stern and unsympathetic eye of the local parish priest. The priest, Father Dewald was blocked at the door when he tried to break up the organising meeting being held in a room of the local pub, Zum Wildschütz. The founders were Franz and Paul Braun, Henry Cleve, Hans Debest, Paul Dziendzielle, Franz, Julius and Wilhelm Jacobi, Hans Kahn, Gustav Müller, Franz Risse, Fritz Schulte, Hans Siebold, August Tönnesmann, Heinrich and Robert Unger, Fritz Weber and Franz Wendt. The name Borussia is Latin for Prussia but was taken from Borussia beer from the nearby Borussia brewery in Dortmund. The team began playing in blue and white striped shirts with a red sash, and black shorts. In 1913, they donned the black and yellow stripes so familiar today.

Over the next decades the club enjoyed only modest success playing in local leagues. They had a brush with bankruptcy in 1929 when an attempt to boost the club's fortunes by signing some paid professional footballers failed miserably and left the team deep in debt. They survived only through the generosity of a local supporter who covered the team's shortfall out of his own pocket.

The 1930s saw the rise of the Third Reich, which restructured sports and football organisations throughout the nation to suit the regime's goals. Borussias president was replaced when he refused to join the Nazi Party, and a couple of members who surreptitiously used the club's offices to produce anti-Nazi pamphlets were executed in the last days of the war. The club did have greater success in the newly established Gauliga Westfalen, but would have to wait until after World War II to make a breakthrough. It was during this time that Borussia developed its intense rivalry with Schalke 04 of suburban Gelsenkirchen, the most successful side of the era (see Revierderby). Like every other organisation in Germany, Borussia was dissolved by the Allied occupation authorities after the war in an attempt to distance the country's institutions from its so-recent Nazi past. There was a short-lived attempt to merge the club with two others – Werksportgemeinschaft Hoesch and Freier Sportverein 98 – as Sportgemeinschaft Borussia von 1898, but it was as Ballspiel-Verein Borussia (BVB) that they made their first appearance in the national league final in 1949, where they lost 2–3 to VfR Mannheim.

First national titles

Between 1946 and 1963, Borussia featured in the Oberliga West, a first division league which dominated German football through the late 1950s. In 1949, Borussia reached the final in Stuttgart against VfR Mannheim, which they lost 2–3 after extra time. The club claimed its first national title in 1956 with a 4–2 win against Karlsruher SC. One year later, Borussia defeated Hamburger SV 4–1 to win their second national title. After this coup, the three Alfredos (Alfred Preißler, Alfred Kelbassa and Alfred Niepieklo) were legends in Dortmund. In 1963, Borussia won the last edition of the German Football Championship (before the introduction of the new Bundesliga) to secure their third national title.

Bundesliga debut
In 1962, the DFB met in Dortmund and voted to establish a professional football league in Germany, to begin play in August 1963 as the Bundesliga. Borussia Dortmund earned its place among the first sixteen clubs to play in the league by winning the last pre-Bundesliga national championship. Runners-up 1. FC Köln also earned an automatic berth. Dortmund's Friedhelm Konietzka scored the first-ever Bundesliga goal a minute into the match, which they would eventually lose 2–3 to Werder Bremen.

In 1965, Dortmund captured its first DFB-Pokal. In 1966, Dortmund won the European Cup Winners' Cup 2–1 against Liverpool in extra time, with the goals coming from Sigfried Held and Reinhard Libuda. In the same year, however, the team surrendered a commanding position atop the Bundesliga by losing four of their last five league games and finishing second, three points behind champions 1860 München. Ironically, much of 1860 München's success came on the strength of the play of Konietzka, recently transferred from Dortmund.

The 1970s were characterised by financial problems, relegation from the Bundesliga in 1972, and the opening of the Westfalenstadion, named after its home region Westphalia in 1974. The club earned its return to Bundesliga in 1976.

Dortmund continued to have financial problems through the 1980s. BVB avoided being relegated in 1986 by winning a third decisive playoff game against Fortuna Köln after finishing the regular season in 16th place.  Dortmund did not enjoy any significant success again until a 4–1 DFB-Pokal win in 1989 against Werder Bremen. It was Horst Köppel's first trophy as a manager. Dortmund then won the 1989 DFL-Supercup 4–3 against rivals Bayern Munich.

Golden age – the 1990s
After a tenth-place finish in the Bundesliga in 1991, manager Horst Köppel was let go and manager Ottmar Hitzfeld was hired.

In 1992, Hitzfeld led Borussia Dortmund to a second-place finish in the Bundesliga and would have won the title had VfB Stuttgart not won their last game to become champions instead.

Along with a fourth-place finish in the Bundesliga, Dortmund made it to the 1993 UEFA Cup final, which they lost 6–1 on aggregate to Juventus. In spite of this result, Borussia walked away with DM25 million under the prize money pool system in place at the time for German sides participating in the Cup. Cash flush, Dortmund was able to sign players who later brought them numerous honours in the 1990s.

Under the captaincy of 1996 European Footballer of the Year Matthias Sammer, Borussia Dortmund won back-to-back Bundesliga titles in 1995 and 1996. Dortmund also won the DFL-Supercup against Mönchengladbach in 1995 and 1. FC Kaiserslautern in 1996.

In 1996–97 the team reached its first European Cup final. In a memorable match at the Olympiastadion in Munich, Dortmund faced the holders Juventus. Karl-Heinz Riedle put Dortmund ahead, shooting under goalkeeper Angelo Peruzzi from a cross by Paul Lambert. Riedle then made it two with a bullet header from a corner kick. In the second half, Alessandro Del Piero pulled one back for Juventus with a back heel. Then 20-year-old substitute and local boy Lars Ricken latched onto a through pass by Andreas Möller. Only 16 seconds after coming on to the pitch, Ricken chipped Peruzzi in the Juventus goal from over 20 yards out with his first touch of the ball. With Zinedine Zidane unable to make an impression for Juventus against the close marking of Lambert, Dortmund lifted the trophy with a 3–1 victory.

Dortmund then went on to beat Brazilian club Cruzeiro 2–0 in the 1997 Intercontinental Cup Final to become world club champions. Borussia Dortmund were the second German club to win the Intercontinental Cup, after Bayern Munich in 1976.

As defending champions Dortmund reached the Champions League semi-final in 1998. The team was missing key players from the start of the season when they played Real Madrid in the '98 semi. Sammer's career was cut short by injury and only played three first team games after the Champions League win. Lambert had left in November to return to play in Scotland. Möller missed the first leg as did Kohler who missed both games in the tie. Real won the first leg 2–0 at home. Dortmund played better in the second leg but failed to take their chances. Dortmund went out 2–0 on aggregate.

21st century and Borussia "goes public"

In October 2000, Borussia Dortmund became the first publicly traded club on the German stock market.

In 2002, Borussia Dortmund won their third Bundesliga title. Dortmund had a remarkable run at the end of the season to overtake Bayer Leverkusen, securing the title on the final day. Manager Matthias Sammer became the first person in Borussia Dortmund history to win the Bundesliga as both a player and manager. In the same season, Borussia lost the final of the 2001–02 UEFA Cup to Dutch side Feyenoord.

Dortmund's fortunes then steadily declined for a number of years. Poor financial management led to a heavy debt load and the sale of their Westfalenstadion grounds. The situation was compounded by failure to advance in the 2003–04 UEFA Champions League, when the team was eliminated on penalties in the qualifying rounds by Club Brugge. In 2003, Bayern Munich loaned €2 million to Dortmund for several months to pay their payroll. Borussia was again driven to the brink of bankruptcy in 2005, the original €11 value of its shares having plummeted by over 80% on the Frankfurt Stock Exchange.

At this time Hans-Joachim Watzke was appointed CEO and streamlined the club. The response to the crisis included a 20% pay cut for all players. In 2006, in order to reduce debt, the Westfalenstadion was renamed "Signal Iduna Park" after a local insurance company. The naming rights agreement runs until 2021.

Dortmund suffered a miserable start to the 2005–06 season, but rallied to finish seventh. The club failed to gain a place in the UEFA Cup via the Fair Play draw. The club's management recently indicated that the club again showed a profit; this was largely related to the sale of David Odonkor to Real Betis and Tomáš Rosický to Arsenal.

In the 2006–07 season, Dortmund unexpectedly faced serious relegation trouble for the first time in years. Dortmund went through three coaches and appointed Thomas Doll on 13 March 2007 after dropping to just one point above the relegation zone. Christoph Metzelder also left Borussia Dortmund on a free transfer.

In the 2007–08 season, Dortmund lost to many smaller Bundesliga clubs. Despite finishing 13th in the Bundesliga table, Dortmund reached the DFB-Pokal Final against Bayern Munich, where they lost 2–1 in extra time. The final appearance qualified Dortmund for the UEFA Cup because Bayern already qualified for the Champions League. Thomas Doll resigned on 19 May 2008 and was replaced by Jürgen Klopp.

Return to prominence

In the 2009–10 season, Klopp's Dortmund improved on the season before finishing fifth in the Bundesliga to qualify for the UEFA Europa League. The team missed an opportunity to qualify for the Champions League by failing to beat eighth-place VfL Wolfsburg and 14th-place SC Freiburg in the final two matches of the campaign.

Entering the 2010–11 season, Dortmund fielded a young and vibrant roster. On 4 December 2010, Borussia became Herbstmeister ("Autumn Champion"), an unofficial accolade going to the league leader at the winter break. They did this three matches before the break, sharing the record for having achieved this earliest with Eintracht Frankfurt (1993–94) and 1. FC Kaiserslautern (1997–98). On 30 April 2011, the club beat 1. FC Nürnberg 2–0 at home, while second-place Bayer Leverkusen lost, leaving Dortmund eight points clear with two games to play. This championship equalled the seven national titles held by rivals Schalke 04, and guaranteed a spot in the 2011–12 Champions League group stages.

One year later, Dortmund made a successful defence of its Bundesliga title with a win over Borussia Mönchengladbach, again on the 32nd match day. By the 34th and final match day, Dortmund set a new record with the most points—81—ever gained by a club in one Bundesliga season. This was surpassed the following season by Bayern Munich's 91 points. The club's eighth championship places it third in total national titles, and players will now wear two stars over their uniform crest in recognition of the team's five Bundesliga titles. Notable names from the winning roster include Lucas Barrios, Mario Götze, Neven Subotić, Mats Hummels, Robert Lewandowski, Shinji Kagawa, Łukasz Piszczek, Jakub Błaszczykowski, Kevin Großkreutz, Ivan Perišić and İlkay Gündoğan. The club capped its successful 2011–12 season by winning the double for the first time by beating Bayern 5–2 in the final of the DFB-Pokal. Borussia Dortmund are one of four German clubs to win the Bundesliga and DFB-Pokal double, along with Bayern Munich, 1. FC Köln and Werder Bremen. The club was voted Team of the Year 2011 at the annual Sportler des Jahres (German Sports Personality of the Year) awards.

Borussia Dortmund ended the 2012–13 season in second place in the Bundesliga. Dortmund played in their second UEFA Champions League Final against Bayern Munich in the first ever all-German club final at Wembley Stadium on 25 May 2013, which they lost 2–1.

In the 2013–14 season, Borussia Dortmund won the 2013 DFL-Supercup 4–2 against rivals Bayern Munich. The 2013–14 season started with a five-game winning streak for Dortmund, their best start to a season. Despite such a promising start, however, their season was hampered by injuries to several key players, seeing them stoop as low as fourth place in the table, and with a depleted squad could go only as far as the quarter-finals of the Champions League, losing 3–2 on aggregate to Real Madrid. Nevertheless, Dortmund managed to end their season on a high note by finishing second in the Bundesliga and reaching the 2014 DFB-Pokal Final, losing 0–2 to Bayern in extra time. They then began their 2014–15 season by defeating Bayern in the 2014 DFL-Supercup 2–0. However, this victory would not be enough to inspire the squad to a solid performance at the start of the ensuing season, with Dortmund recording various results such as a 0–1 loss to Hamburger SV and two 2–2 draws against VfB Stuttgart and Bundesliga newcomers Paderborn 07. During the winter, Dortmund fell to the bottom of the table on multiple occasions, but managed to escape the relegation zone after four consecutive wins in February. On 15 April 2015, Jürgen Klopp announced that after seven years, he would be leaving Dortmund. Four days later, Dortmund announced that Thomas Tuchel would replace Klopp at the end of the season. Klopp's final season, however, ended on high note, rising and finishing seventh after facing relegation, gaining a DFB-Pokal final with VfL Wolfsburg and qualifying for the 2015–16 Europa League.

Post-Klopp era
In the 2015–16 season, Dortmund started off on a high, winning 4–0 against Borussia Mönchengladbach on the opening day, followed by five-straight wins which took them to the top of the Bundesliga. After the eighth matchday, they were surpassed by Bayern Munich following an unlucky draw with 1899 Hoffenheim. Dortmund kept their performances up, winning 24 out of 34 league games and becoming the best Bundesliga runner-up team of all time. In the Europa League, they advanced to the quarter-finals, getting knocked out by a Jürgen Klopp-led Liverpool in a dramatic comeback at Anfield, where defender Dejan Lovren scored a late goal to make it 4–3 to the Reds and 5–4 on aggregate. In the 2015–16 DFB-Pokal, for the third-straight year Dortmund made it to the competition final, but lost to Bayern Munich on penalties.

On 11 April 2017, three explosions occurred near the team's bus on its way to a Champions League match against AS Monaco at the Signal Iduna Park. Defender Marc Bartra was injured, and taken to hospital. Dortmund went on to lose the game 2–3 to AS Monaco. Dortmund's manager, Thomas Tuchel, blamed the loss as a result of an ignorant decision by UEFA. UEFA went on to say that the team made no objection to playing, and that the decision was made in compliance with the club and local law enforcement. In the second leg, Dortmund went on to lose 1–3, leaving the aggregate score at 3–6, and seeing them eliminated from that year's UEFA Champions League. On 26 April, Dortmund defeated Bayern Munich 3–2 in Munich to advance to the 2017 DFB-Pokal Final, Dortmund's fourth consecutive final and fifth in six seasons. On 27 May, Dortmund won the 2016–17 DFB-Pokal 2–1 over Eintracht Frankfurt with the winner coming from a penalty converted by Pierre-Emerick Aubameyang.

Ahead of the 2017–18 season, Thomas Tuchel stepped down as manager. The Dortmund board made a decision to hire Peter Bosz as the new manager and head coach. Although Bosz got off to a record-breaking start in the team's first 7 games, what followed was 20 games without a win, after which he was relieved of his staff role. Peter Stöger was announced as the interim coach. During the January window of the same season, Aubameyang and Bartra both left the club. Stöger bought Manuel Akanji of FC Basel for a fee of €21.5 million and Michy Batshuayi on a six-month loan from Chelsea. Stöger coached Dortmund for the rest of the season, granting them a fourth-place finish in the Bundesliga before stepping down at the end of the season. Michy Batshuayi also returned to Chelsea.

In the summer of 2018, Dortmund appointed former OGC Nice coach, Lucien Favre as their manager/head coach. After a very busy transfer window for the team, seeing eight new players arrive at the club for the first team squad, Dortmund performed strongly, chasing Bayern Munich for the title race down to the last matchday, narrowly missing out on the league title by two points and earning Lucien Favre a contract extension. A four-part Amazon Prime Video documentary series was created, about the same season, named "Inside Borussia Dortmund".

The next season, Dortmund pulled off a few big-name signings with the intent of winning the Bundesliga title. Although they won the DFL Supercup, this was their only silverware this season. After a scrappy first half of the season, they changed their tactics and made a few more transfers in the January Window. They were eliminated in both the DFB-Pokal and the UEFA Champions League as well. Due to the COVID-19 pandemic in Germany, the season stopped abruptly. Once the restart occurred, Dortmund looked better but their performances were not enough to stop a dominant Bayern Munich side from grasping the Bundesliga title. They finished the 2019–20 season in second place after beating RB Leipzig in matchweek 33 due to a brace from Erling Haaland.

Dortmund got off to a rather shaky start in the 2020–21 season. They lost the DFL-Supercup and had an inconsistent set of results in the Champions League and the Bundesliga. After a humiliating 5–1 defeat to Stuttgart in Matchday 11, Lucien Favre was relieved of his managerial duties. Assistant manager Edin Terzić was placed as the caretaker for the rest of the season. Under Terzić, Dortmund finished third on the final matchday of the Bundesliga and was eliminated in the quarter-finals of the Champions League in a clash against Manchester City. The team then managed to win the DFB-Pokal, defeating RB Leipzig 4–1 in the final. Marco Rose was appointed manager for the 2021–22 season with Terzić being appointed as the club's new technical director.

Crest

Grounds

Stadiums
The Westfalenstadion is the home stadium of Borussia Dortmund, Germany's largest stadium and the seventh-largest in Europe. The stadium is officially named "Signal Iduna Park" after insurance company Signal Iduna purchased the rights to name the stadium until 2021. This name, however, cannot be used when hosting FIFA and UEFA events, since these governing bodies have policies forbidding corporate sponsorship from companies that are not official tournament partners. During the 2006 World Cup, the stadium was referred to as "FIFA World Cup Stadium, Dortmund", while in UEFA club matches, it is known as "BVB Stadion Dortmund". The stadium currently hosts up to 81,359 spectators (standing and seated) for league matches and 65,829 seated spectators for international matches. For these, the characteristic southern grandstand is re-equipped with seats to conform to FIFA regulations.

In 1974, the Westfalenstadion replaced the Stadion Rote Erde, which is located next door and serves now as the stadium of Borussia Dortmund II. After the increasing popularity of Borussia Dortmund in the 1960s, it became obvious that the traditional ground was too small for the increasing number of Borussia Dortmund supporters. The city of Dortmund, however, was not able to finance a new stadium and federal institutions were unwilling to help. But in 1971, Dortmund was selected to replace the city of Cologne, which was forced to withdraw its plans to host games in the 1974 World Cup. The funds originally set aside for the projected stadium in Cologne were thus re-allocated to Dortmund, and a new stadium became reality.

The Westfalenstadion has undergone several renovations throughout the years to increase the size of the stadium, including an expansion of the stadium for the 2006 World Cup. In 2008, the Borusseum, a museum about Borussia Dortmund, opened in the stadium. In 2011, Borussia Dortmund agreed to a partnership with Q-Cells. The company installed 8,768 solar cells on the roof of the Westfalenstadion to generate up to 860,000 kWh per year.

Borussia Dortmund has the highest average attendance of any football club worldwide. In 2014, it was estimated that each of the club's home games is attended by around 1,000 British spectators, drawn to the team by its low ticket prices compared to the Premier League.

Training ground
Borussia Dortmund's training ground and Academy base Hohenbuschei is located in Brackel, a district of Dortmund. Inside the complex, there are physical exercise training for physical fitness and rehabilitation robotics areas, physiotherapy and massage rooms, and remedial and hydrotherapy pools. There are also sauna rooms, steam rooms and weight rooms, classrooms, conference halls, offices for the BVB front office, a restaurant, and a TV studio to interview the BVB professional footballers and coaching staff for BVB total!, the channel owned by the club. On the grounds, there are five grass pitches, two of which have under-soil heating, one artificial grass field, three small grass pitches and a multi-functional sports arena. In addition, the club owns a Footbonaut, a training robot which is effectively a  training cage.

The training complex and youth performance centre, located in Hohenbuschei, will be expanded in stages until 2021. In addition, the Sports Business Office will be entirely rebuilt from scratch. The planned construction, which will cost up to 20 million euros, will make BVB the best-equipped football club in the country with regards to infrastructure.

In the Strobelallee Training Centre, the BVB Evonik Football Academy has an outstanding training venue exclusively at its disposal. Among others, the Bundesliga-team used to prepare for their matches on the club's former training ground.

Organisation and finance
Borussia Dortmund e.V. is represented by its management board and a board of directors consisting of president Dr. Reinhard Rauball, his proxy and vice-president Gerd Pieper, and treasurer Dr. Reinhold Lunow.

Professional football at Dortmund is run by the organisation Borussia Dortmund GmbH & Co. KGaA. This corporation model has two types of participators: at least one partner with unlimited liability and at least one partner with limited liability. The investment of the latter is divided into stocks. The organisation Borussia Dortmund GmbH is the partner with unlimited liability and is responsible for the management and representation of Borussia Dortmund GmbH & Co. KGaA. Borussia Dortmund GmbH is fully owned by the sports club, Borussia Dortmund e.V. This organizational structure was designed to ensure that the sports club has full control over the professional squad.

The stock of Borussia Dortmund GmbH & Co. KGaA was floated on the stock market in October 2000 and is listed in the General Standard of Deutsche Börse AG. Borussia Dortmund GmbH & Co. KGaA became the first and so far the only publicly traded sports club on the German stock market. 5.53% of Borussia Dortmund GmbH & Co. KGaA is owned by the sports club, Borussia Dortmund e.V.; 9.33% by Bernd Geske; and 59.93% widely spread shareholdings. Hans-Joachim Watzke is the CEO and Thomas Treß is the CFO of the GmbH & Co. KGaA. Michael Zorc as sporting director is responsible for the first team, the coaching staff, the youth and junior section, and scouting. The supervisory board consists, among others, of politicians Werner Müller and Peer Steinbrück.

Borussia Dortmund e.V. and Borussia Dortmund GmbH & Co. KGaA's economic indicators reveal that BVB will be generating revenue of €305 million (US$408 million) from September 2012 to August 2013.

According to the 2015 Deloitte's annual Football Money League, BVB generated revenues of €262 million during the 2013–14 season. This figure excludes player transfer fees, VAT and other sales-related taxes.

Current management and board

Kits and sponsorship

Dortmund's main advertising partner and current shirt sponsor is Evonik. The insurance company Signal Iduna purchased the rights to name the Westfalenstadion Signal Iduna Park until 2021. The main equipment supplier is Puma since the 2012–13 season. The contract is currently valid. The club announced a deal with Opel to be the first-ever sleeve sponsor from the 2017–18 season.

In addition, there are three different levels of partners: BVBChampionPartner includes among others Opel, bwin, Brinkhoff's, Wilo, Hankook and EA Sports; BVBPartner includes among others MAN, Eurowings, Coca-Cola, Ruhr Nachrichten, REWE and Aral; and BVBProduktPartner includes among others ofo, Westfalenhallen and TEDi.

Since 2012, Brixental in the Kitzbühel Alps in Austria is a BVB sponsor as well; furthermore, the region is host of one of the annual summer training camps.

Sponsors

Charity
Borussia Dortmund has raised money for charity over the years for various causes. On 17 May 2011, Borussia Dortmund held a charity game for the 2011 Japan earthquake and tsunami against "Team Japan". Ticket sales from the game and €1 million from Dortmund's main sponsor Evonik went to charity for Japan earthquake and tsunami victims. In November 2012, Borussia Dortmund KGaA founded a charitable trust called leuchte auf, to give important social projects financial help.
The trust's logo is a star consisting of the streets which meet at Dortmund's Borsigplatz, where the club was founded. On 6 July 2013, Borussia Dortmund held a charity game to raise money for 2013 German flood victims in the German states of Saxony and Saxony-Anhalt.

In March 2020, Borussia Dortmund, Bayern Munich, RB Leipzig, and Bayer Leverkusen, the four German UEFA Champions League teams for the 2019–20 season, collectively gave €20 million to Bundesliga and 2. Bundesliga teams that were struggling financially during the COVID-19 pandemic.

Since 1996, during Advent, Borussia Dortmund players visit the children's hospital in Dortmund where the players meet with the patients and give them gifts.

Players
Current squad

Out on loan

Players with first-team appearances

Reserves and academy

Club captains
Since 1963, 18 players have held the position of club captain for Borussia Dortmund. The first club captain after the introduction of the Bundesliga was Alfred Schmidt, who was captain from 1963 to 1965. The longest-serving captain Michael Zorc, who was club captain from 1988 to 1997, has the distinction of having won the most trophies as captain; he won two Bundesliga titles, one DFB-Pokal, three DFL-Supercups and one UEFA Champions League. The current club captain is Marco Reus, who took over after Marcel Schmelzer stepped down from his role as the club's captain for the 2018–19 season.

Non-playing staff

Head coaches
In July 1935, Fritz Thelen became the club's first full-time head coach, but was not available in the first months of the season, forcing Dortmund player and Germany international Ernst Kuzorra to take over instead. In 1966, Willi Multhaup led his side to the European Cup Winners' Cup, the first German team to win a European trophy. Horst Köppel was the coach to bring major silverware to the club for the first time in over 20 years, winning the DFB-Pokal in 1989.

Ottmar Hitzfeld is the club's most successful coach, having won both the Bundesliga and Supercup twice. In 1997, Dortmund had waited for continental success for over 30 years; Hitzfeld crowned his period with an unexpected triumph and won the Champions League. Dortmund won the Intercontinental Cup in 1997 and head coach Nevio Scala became the first and so far the only non-native speaker who won a major title. In 2001–02, Matthias Sammer, a former BVB player, brought the league title back to Dortmund. In 2008–09, the club approached Mainz 05 head coach Jürgen Klopp. He won the club's seventh championship title in 2010–11. In his fourth season, Dortmund won the Bundesliga and the DFB-Pokal to complete the first league and cup double in the club's history. Successor Thomas Tuchel won the 2016–17 DFB-Pokal.

On 22 May 2018, Lucien Favre was confirmed as the new head coach of the club for the 2018–19 season. He was able to win the 2019 DFL-Supercup on 3 August 2019.

On 12 December 2020, Dortmund suffered a 5–1 defeat against VfB Stuttgart. Favre was fired the next day.

Records

Borussia Dortmund's name is attached to a number of Bundesliga and European records:

 The Borussia Dortmund player with the most appearances is Michael Zorc, with 572 in all competitions.
 The Borussia Dortmund player with the most goals is Alfred Preissler, with 177 in all competitions.
 The most goals ever in a UEFA Champions League match (12) occurred when Dortmund beat Legia Warsaw 8–4 in the 2016–17 season.
 Youssoufa Moukoko became the youngest player in Bundesliga history (aged 16 years and 1 day) when he appeared for Borussia Dortmund against Hertha BSC on 21 November 2020.
 Moukoko also became the youngest player in UEFA Champions League history (aged 16 years and 18 days) when he was subbed on for Dortmund against Zenit Saint Petersburg on 8 December 2020.
 Moukoko became both the youngest goalscorer in Bundesliga history and the youngest player to score for Dortmund (aged 16 years and 28 days) after netting against Union Berlin on 18 December 2020.
 Dortmund was on the receiving end of the worst loss ever in a Bundesliga match when they suffered a 12–0 defeat away to Borussia Mönchengladbach on 29 April 1978.
 BVB and Bayern Munich were carded a record of 15 times (3 for Dortmund, 12 for Munich) in a match played on 7 April 2001.
 The most penalties given in a Bundesliga match was five, in a game played between Borussia Mönchengladbach and Dortmund on 9 November 1965.
 The first goal ever scored in Bundesliga play was by Dortmund's Friedhelm Konietzka against Werder Bremen; however, Werder Bremen won 3–2.
 Former Borussia Dortmund striker Pierre-Emerick Aubameyang is one of only three players, the others being Klaus Allofs and Robert Lewandowski, to have scored at least once in ten straight Bundesliga matchdays. He was also the first player ever to score at least once in the first eight matchdays of a Bundesliga season, and formerly held the record for most Bundesliga goals in a single season by a foreign player (31 in 2016–17).

Honours
Domestic
 German Championship/Bundesliga Winners: 1956, 1957, 1963, 1994–95, 1995–96, 2001–02, 2010–11, 2011–12
 Runners-up: 1949, 1961, 1965–66, 1991–92, 2012–13, 2013–14, 2015–16, 2018–19, 2019–20, 2021–22
 2. Bundesliga North Runners-up: 1975–76
 DFB-Pokal Winners: 1964–65, 1988–89, 2011–12, 2016–17, 2020–21
 Runners-up: 1962–63, 2007–08, 2013–14, 2014–15, 2015–16
 DFB/DFL-Supercup Winners: 1989, 1995, 1996, 2013, 2014, 2019
 Runners-up: 2011, 2012, 2016, 2017, 2020, 2021
 DFB-Ligapokal Runners-up: 2003

European
 UEFA Champions League Winners: 1996–97
 Runners-up: 2012–13
 European Cup Winners' Cup Winners: 1965–66
 UEFA Cup Runners-up: 1992–93, 2001–02
 UEFA Super Cup Runners-up: 1997

International
 Intercontinental Cup Winners: 1997

Regional
 Oberliga West/West German Championship
 Winners: 1947–48, 1948–49, 1949–50, 1952–53, 1955–56, 1956–57 (record)
 Runners-up: 1960–61, 1962–63
 Westphalia Cup Winners:' 1947

UEFA club coefficient ranking

Affiliated clubs
The following clubs are currently affiliated with Borussia Dortmund:
  Hyderabad FC
  Buriram United
  Marconi Stallions FC
  Iwate Grulla Morioka
  Hoa Binh
  BVB International Academy Waterloo

See also
Borussia Dortmund II
Borussia Dortmund Youth Sector
List of Borussia Dortmund seasons

References

External links

Borussia Dortmund on Bundeliga official website
Borussia Dortmund on UEFA official website

 
1909 establishments in Germany
Association football clubs established in 1909
Sport in Dortmund
Football clubs in Germany
Football clubs in North Rhine-Westphalia
G-14 clubs
Multi-sport clubs in Germany
Publicly traded sports companies
UEFA Champions League winning clubs
UEFA Cup Winners' Cup winning clubs
Intercontinental Cup winning clubs
Bundesliga clubs
2. Bundesliga clubs